Donovan's solution is an inorganic compound prepared from arsenic triiodide and mercuric iodide. Despite its name, it is a compound and not a solution.

Method
Donovan's solution can be prepared by mixing arsenic triiodide, mercuric iodide, and sodium bicarbonate in aqueous solution.

Cooley's cyclopædia of practical receipts and ... information on the arts, manufactures, and trades gives a more complex method.

Uses
The solution been used in veterinary medicine to treat chronic diseases of the skin and as a folk remedy. It was used during the 19th century to treat lepra vulgaris and psoriasis in humans, taken internally.

References

External links 

Inorganic compounds
Arsenic(III) compounds
Iodides
Mercury compounds